Taylforth is a surname. Notable people with the surname include:

Colin Taylforth (born 1953), English pair skater
George Taylforth (born 1941), English-Australian rugby league player
Gillian Taylforth (born 1955), English actress
Kim Taylforth (born 1958), English actress
Sean Taylforth (born 1989), English footballer